David Holcomb was a U.S. State Senator in the Ohio Senate.  He served from January 3, 1967 – December 31, 1972.  In 1970, he ran unsuccessfully for the Republican nomination for U.S. Senator.

References

Ohio state senators
Living people
Year of birth missing (living people)